Amanat Baghdad Stadium is a football stadium in Baghdad, Iraq. It is currently used mostly for football matches and is the home stadium of Amanat Baghdad SC. It has a capacity of 5,000 spectators.

See also 
List of football stadiums in Iraq

References

Football venues in Iraq
Buildings and structures in Baghdad
Sport in Baghdad
2010 establishments in Iraq
Sports venues completed in 2010